A Beautiful Friendship may refer to:

Fiction 
 "A Beautiful Friendship", a short story by David Weber in the 1998 Honorverse anthology More Than Honor
 A Beautiful Friendship (novel), a 2011 Honorverse novel by David Weber

Music 
 A Beautiful Friendship (album), by the Don Thompson Quartet, 1984
 A Beautiful Friendship, an album by Brian Lemon, 1995
 A Beautiful Friendship, an album by Lenore Raphael
 A Beautiful Friendship, an album by Rebecca Parris, 1994
 "A Beautiful Friendship", a song by composer Donald Kahn and lyricist Stanley Styne, recorded by Ella Fitzgerald, 1956

See also
 Beautiful Friendship (disambiguation)